Ricky Moore may refer to:
 Ricky Moore (American football) (born 1963), American former football running back in the National Football League (NFL)
 Ricky Moore (basketball) (born 1976), American retired basketball player and coach
 Ricky Moore (chef), American chef who owns Saltbox Seafood Joint in Durham, North Carolina